A tree is a perennial woody plant.

Tree or trees may also refer to:

Information representation
Tree structure or tree diagram, a way of representing a hierarchical nature of structure in a graphical form
Family tree, used in genealogy to show familial relationships
Decision tree, a tree model of decisions and their consequences
Dialogue tree, used to generate conversations
Parse tree, used in linguistics to represent the syntax of sentences

Mathematics
Tree (descriptive set theory), a set of finite sequences of elements of X that is closed under subsequences, on a set X
Tree (graph theory), a connected graph without cycles
Tree (set theory), like a graph-theory tree, but with a distinguished root, and possibly having chains of transfinite length
Tree diagram (probability theory), a tree-like representation of a probability space
TREE, an extremely fast-growing function; see Kruskal's tree theorem

Computing
Tree (automata theory)
Tree (command), a recursive directory listing program that produces a depth indented listing of files
Tree (data structure), a widely used computer data structure that emulates a tree structure with a set of linked nodes
Tree network, a type of computer and communication network topology
Digital tree, prefix tree or trie, a computer science ordered tree data structure

Films
The Tree (1969 film), an American film directed by Robert Guenette
The Tree (1993 film), a short film
The Tree (2001 film), a Singaporean film directed by Daisy Chan
The Tree (2010 film), an Australian/French film directed by Julie Bertuccelli
The Tree (2014 film), a Slovenian film directed by Sonja Prosenc

Literature
Tree (novel), a 1978 historical novel by F. Sionil José
"Trees" (poem), a 1913 poem by Joyce Kilmer
The Trees (Richter novel), a 1940 novel by Conrad Richter
The Tree (book), an autobiographical book by John Fowles
The Tree (play), a 1957 play by Stella Jones
"The Tree" (short story), a short horror story by H. P. Lovecraft
Ms. Tree, a comic book and the title character
Trees (comics), a science fiction comic book series by Warren Ellis and Jason Howard
Trends in Ecology and Evolution, a scientific journal
Our Father Who Art in the Tree, a 2002 novel by Judy Pascoe, reprinted in 2010 as simply The Tree
The Trees (Everett novel), a 2022 novel by Percival Everett

Music

Bands
 Trees (band), British folk band

Albums
Trees (Avantdale Bowling Club album), 2022
Tree (Gaelic Storm album), 2001
Tree (Johnny Duhan album), 2002
Tree (TVXQ album), 2014
Tree (Sekai no Owari album),2015
 The Tree (album), 2018

Songs
 "Trees", a 1961 song by the Platters
 "Trees", a song by Twenty One Pilots from the album Vessel, 2013
 "The Trees" (Rush song), a 1978 song by Rush
 "The Trees" (Pulp song), a 2001 song by Pulp
 "The Trees", a song by Autechre from the album Untilted, 2005
 "Trees", a 2011 song by Twenty One Pilots

People
Tree (surname), a surname (including a list of people with the name)
Keith "Tree" Barry (born 1964), American musician
Tree Gelbman, a fictional character in Happy Death Day and its sequel, Happy Death Day 2U
 Lavon "Tree" Mercer (born 1959), American-Israeli basketball player
Tree Rollins (born 1955), American basketball player

Other uses
Tree (dominoes), a domino game in which every double is a spinner
Tree (Wu Xing), the first movement in Wu Xing philosophy
Tree River, a Canadian river
Sacred tree, a tree believed to be sacred
Stanford Tree, unofficial mascot of Stanford University
The Tree (tonewood), a famous very large mahogany tree felled in Honduras, renowned for its highly-figured grain and popular with luthiers for guitar sides and backs 
Trees Dallas, a live music venue in the Deep Ellum district of Dallas, Texas
Tree (installation), an art installation in Paris, France
Shoe tree, a device for storing shoes
Tree, the wooden understructure of a horse's saddle
Tree model, about language family trees in historical linguistics

See also

Treeing, a method of hunting with dogs
Electrical treeing
Tre (disambiguation)

bs:Drvo (čvor)
ca:Arbre (desambiguació)
da:Træ
de:Baum (Begriffsklärung)
eo:Arbo (apartigilo)
fr:Arbre (homonymie)
hr:Drvo (razdvojba)
id:Pohon (disambiguasi)
it:Albero (disambigua)
ka:ხე
lv:Koks (nozīmju atdalīšana)
lt:Medis (reikšmės)
hu:Fa (egyértelműsítő lap)
nl:Boom
pl:Drzewo (ujednoznacznienie)
ro:Arbore (dezambiguizare)
ru:Дерево (значения)
sk:Strom (rozlišovacia stránka)
sl:Drevo (razločitev)
mi:Rakau